Strashila is an extinct genus of nematoceran flies in the family Strashilidae. There are at least two described species in Strashila.

Species
These two species belong to the genus Strashila:
 † Strashila daohugouensis Huang, Nel, Cai, Lin & Engel, 2013 Daohugou, China, Callovian
 † Strashila incredibilis Rasnitsyn, 1992 Badin Formation, Russia, Oxfordian

References

Mecoptera
Articles created by Qbugbot
Jurassic insects of Asia